Court Ridge is a low, ice-drowned ridge extending to Sulzberger Ice Shelf from the northwestern extremity of the Haines Mountains, in the Ford Ranges of Marie Byrd Land. It was discovered by members of the Byrd Antarctic Expedition on the Northeast Flight of December 15–16, 1934, and named for Arnold Court, a meteorologist at the West Base of the United States Antarctic Service (1939–41).

References
 

Ridges of Marie Byrd Land